Spathius elegans is a species of doryctine wasps. It is widespread in the eastern United States.

References

External links 

 
 Spathius elegans at bugguide.net

Braconidae
Insects described in 1970